The Turkmen Naval Forces   (Turkmen: Türkmenistanyň Harby-deňiz Güýçleri) is the naval warfare branch of the armed forces of Turkmenistan. Turkmenistan's Navy Day is celebrated annually on October 9. The naval forces were directed by the Border Guard Service until 2009.

History 
The Turkmenistan navy was established in 1992. From 1992 to 1997, the Navy of Turkmenistan existed as a separate division of border guard ships and boats, deployed in the city of Turkmenbashy as part of the Border Troops of the Ministry of Defense of Turkmenistan, and then transferred to the subordination of the State Border Service of Turkmenistan. In August 2009, President of Turkmenistan Gurbanguly Berdimuhammedov announced the creation of a new independent navy, saying that it would be used to protect the nation from external threats, such as "international terrorist groups" who "would like to disturb the Turkmen people's peaceful life". On 1 October 2009, Berdimuhammedov declared the previous Turkmen Navy null and void. On 22 January 2010, a 5-year program for the development of the Navy was implemented, which laid the foundation for the creation of a national Navy as part of the Ministry of Defense.

At the end of that five-year period in 2015, the navy engaged in its first major action since establishment. Turkmen naval vessels fired on a fishing boat from Iran, sinking it and killing one of the fishermen. Iranian media referred to the navy's actions as "a move beyond diplomatic norms and contrary to international law". In September 2017, it held its first naval exercises in the Caspian Sea. In early 2018, efforts were continued to strengthen the navy.

On 11 August 2021, President Berdimuhammedov commissioned the navy's first domestically assembled corvette, the Deniz Khan.

Organization
In 2010, the Turkmenistan Navy consisted of 16 patrol boats and 2,000 servicemen.

Ships
Patrol Ship Sanjar
Deňiz han-class corvette

Bases
The main naval base of Turkmenistan is Janga Naval Base located in the Turkmenbashy Gulf. Ogurja Ada Naval Base is also used by the navy. In order to control and regulate access to the naval base, barriers were installed by the NICE Ltd. at several points: at the entrance of the base, the military lodgings, the construction site, the docks, and the ammunition depot.

Turkmen Marines 

A naval infantry (marine) unit is maintained in the Navy, the Naval Infantry Separate Brigade named after Oghuz Khagan. It was issued its new colors in October 2011.

Equipment
Equipment as of 2022 regardless of the operating service

Under the Defence Ministry 
Equipment as of 2015:

Under the DSG
Equipment includes:

Naval education

Turkmen Naval Institute 
In June 2010, the State Security Council of Turkmenistan announced the creation of a naval institute in Turkmenbashi. It was officially opened by President Berdimuhamedow on Navy Day in 2015. It is one of the more recently established military educational institutions in Turkmenistan. In September 2014, over 100 cadets of the naval institute attended a training course organized by the OSCE on maritime border security and the management of ports. 
Candidates are admitted to the Naval Institute based on the results of entrance exams of the Ministry of Defense of Turkmenistan.

The following have served as rectors of the institute:

 Colonel Serdar Yalkabov (June 2010-3 August 2021)
 Captain 2nd Rank Meylis Byashimov (since 3 August 2021)

Specialized Naval School 
The Specialized Naval School is a boarding school for Turkmen youth, part of the defense ministry. Admission to study at the Specialized Naval School requires youth who are in 7th grade as well as morally educated and physically strong students.

Ranks and insignia

Commissioned officer ranks
The rank insignia of commissioned officers.

Other ranks
The rank insignia of non-commissioned officers and enlisted personnel.

See also 
Armed Forces of Turkmenistan
Turkmen Ground Forces
Turkmen Air Force
Navy Day (Turkmenistan)

References

External links
 Janga Naval Base on OpenStreetMap

Military of Turkmenistan
Military units and formations established in 1992
Navies by country
Naval forces in the Caspian Sea